Ram Saroj Yadav is a Nepalese politician and member of Provincial Assembly. Yadav was also the parliamentary party leader for the  Nepali Congress in the Provincial Assembly and  Minister for Physical Infrastructure Development of Madhesh Province. He is also a expeditionary of Maithili language and had come in light after demanding it as official language of Madhesh Province.

Yadav, a resident of Dhanusha, was elected to the 2017 and 2022 provincial assembly elections from Dhanusha3(A).

Personal life 
Ram Saroj Yadav was born in a Yadav family in Bahiri of Dhanusha district on 18 November 1953.

Political career 

He came in active politics while he was studying at RRM Campus, Janakpur. He has also served as the chairman of District Development Committee, Dhanusha.

Yadav was unable to win election in Second CA election 2070 with narrow vote difference when he was fielded as candidate from Dhanusha 4. He is the leader of Nepali Congress parliamentary party in Provincial Assembly of Madhesh Province.

On 9 June 2021, he joined LalBabu Raut ministry as minister of Physical Infrastructure along with 2 more legislators from Nepali Congress. He is supposed to be a person close to Nepali Congress former Vice-president  Bimalendra Nidhi.

Electoral history

2022 Nepalese provincial elections

2017 Nepalese provincial elections

2013 Constituent Assembly election

See also 
Nepali Congress
Bimalendra Nidhi 
Nepali Congress, Madhesh Province

References 

Living people
People from Dhanusha District
Nepali Congress politicians from Madhesh Province
1953 births
Provincial cabinet ministers of Nepal
Members of the 1st Nepalese Constituent Assembly
Members of the Provincial Assembly of Madhesh Province